This is a list of Live with Regis and Kelly episodes which were broadcast during the show's 23rd season.  The list is ordered by air date.

Although the co-hosts may have read a couple of emails during the broadcast, it does not necessarily count as a "Regis and Kelly Inbox" segment.

September 2010

October 2010

November 2010

December 2010

January 2011

February 2011

March 2011

April 2011

May 2011

June 2011

July 2011

August 2011

References

2010 American television seasons
2011 American television seasons